The Ullíbarri-Gamboa Reservoir is located in Álava, Basque Country, Spain. Together with the nearby , it provides water to the nearby city of Vitoria-Gasteiz and to Bilbao and its metropolitan area. The whole reservoir has been designated as a Natura 2000 site, and the southeastern end of the reservoir is also protected as a Ramsar wetland. It is also a popular leisure area, particularly for hiking and bathing.

History 
The reservoir was built in the 1950s, when Spain was under the term of office of Francisco Franco. All started in 1926 when Manuel Uribe-Echevarría asked for a new reservoir between Bilbao and Vitoria-Gasteiz, because of the demand of electricity after the industrial revolution and the growth of population. Unfortunately this construction was refused to be done in 1928.

Later, in the second Spanish republic (1935), they approved the construction of the reservoir but it was not until 1945 when they started working on that, due to delays deliberated by the civil war. In this year Altos Hornos de Vizcaya S.A. was the company that started the project with the help of Saltos y Aguas del Zadorra. The works started in 1947 and finished in 1957 and were built by more than 3,500 men.

Problems 

The Gamboa valley was the place where nowadays is the reservoir. In this valley were villages like Azua, Garaio, Landa, Larrinzar... and much more. All this villages were affected by the works and they could not do anything against it. Mendizabal, Landa and Zuazo de Gamboa were completely flooded under the water and other villages were also affected but not as bad as there. The people who lived in this villages lost their homes, properties and lands, consequently they all moved to other places to live. 
Nowadays, in summer, when the water level is low, all these ruins can be seen down the water.

The fauna and the flora were also affected by these changes. Some plants were broken and drowned by the water while others adapted to the aquatic life and some seaweed developed. With the time this ecosystem has turned in an aquatic ecosystem and it became a Ramsar Site and part of the Natura 2000 network.

Islands 

The reservoir surrounds three islands, Zuhatza, The island of the Horses and Orenin.

Zuhatza 

This island provides little cabins to stay all around the island. It may be famous for its large number of rabbits and it is also called the island of the rabbits. It offers the possibility to practice many aquatic sports, such as windsurfing, sailing, rowing and canoeing.

The island of the horses 

It is an island next to Zuhatza which does not provide as much as Zuhatza island does.

Orenin 

Before the reservoir was constructed, it was a village that could be accessible by car, but after the reservoir it ended up being an isolated small island. Nowadays it is abandoned but it turned up to be a place where bird colonies stay during the summer season.

Supply 

Currently the reservoir supplies water for a 50% of the Basque Country. In the village of Ullíbarri-Gamboa they pump more than 800 L/s to provide to Vitoria-Gasteiz. Besides, there is a hydroelectric energy station, next to Vizcaya, which works with the help of this reservoir. Furthermore, it helps the Zadorra river not to alter its course when the water level is very high, it can evacuate 570 m³ per second.

Natural Parks 

In this surroundings there are three natural parks: Garaio Provincial Park, Landa Provincial Park and Mendijur Ornithological Park.

Garaio Provincial Park 

The Garaio Provincial Park is located next to the Zadorra river, forming a small peninsula. It has many forests that makes it easy to have a close bond with nature. It is accessible by car and has many ruts which can be done cycling or walking. However, it is next to Garaio, a village in which cottages can be rented and it offers a relaxing stay in the area.

Landa Provincial Park 

The Landa Provincial Park is next to the village Landa, 17 km away from Vitoria-Gasteiz. It is on northeast of the reservoir and it offers a small beach to stay at. Most inhabitants from Vitoria come here on summer and the old railway tracks are now wide ways for bicycles.

Mendijur Ornithological Park 

The Mendixur area is place where the surface water zone is impressive. It has 70 ha of extension and it is commonly frequented by people who like nature and would like to know more about the ecosystem of this place. Moreover, the animal that abound are the birds and depending on the season the type of birds go changing. It is a part of the net Natura 2000. In Euskal Herria, this passion for the birds has led to a new hobby called birding, which is popular in some other countries of Europe.

References

External links 
 
 
 

1956 establishments in the Basque Country (autonomous community)
Lakes of Álava
Natura 2000 in the Basque Country (autonomous community)
Protected areas established in 2002
Protected areas of the Basque Country (autonomous community)
Ramsar sites in Spain
Reservoirs in the Basque Country (autonomous community)
Wetlands of the Basque Country (autonomous community)